The 2021 Cork Intermediate A Football Championship was the 86th staging of the Cork Intermediate A Football Championship since its establishment by the Cork County Board in 1909. The draw for the group stage placings took place on 29 April 2021. The championship began on 4 September 2021 and ended on 5 December 2021.

The final was played on 5 December 2021 at Páirc Uí Chaoimh in Cork, between Iveleary and Mitchelstown, in what was their first ever meeting in a final. Iveleary won the match by 0-20 to 0-07 to claim their first ever championship title.

Iveleary's Chris Óg Jones was the championship's top scorer with 5-38.

Team changes

To Championship

Promoted from the Cork Junior A Football Championship
 Iveleary

Relegated from the Cork Premier Intermediate Football Championship
 Gabriel Rangers

From Championship

Promoted to the Cork Premier Intermediate Football Championship
 Rockchapel

Relegated to the City Junior A Football Championship
 Mayfield

Results

Group A

Table

Results

Group B

Table

Results

Group C

Table

Results

Group D

Table

Results

Relegation stage

Playoff

Knockout stage

Quarter-finals

Semi-finals

Final

References

External links
 Cork GAA website

Cork Intermediate Football Championship